Aulacaspis, is a scale insect genus in the family Diaspididae. The type species is Aulacaspis rosae.

Species

Former species
 Aulacaspis malayala Varshney, 2002 invalid

Gallery

Notes

References

External links 

Sternorrhyncha genera
Diaspidini